Tye-Angsi Sirijanga Sing Thebe Limbu was an 18th-century Limbu scholar, educator, historian, linguist, leader, and philosopher of Limbuwan and Sikkim. He was formally known as Sirichongba and even more popularly known as "Sirijanga."

Life

Sirijanga was born in Tellok  kuchintar (Yangwarok area) in Limbuwan in 1704. His real name was Rupi Hang. The (Hang or Yakthung) part of the name is a common Limbu term indicating a family of high or royal origin. Sirijanga had accepted his Lepcha nickname by claiming to be the incarnation of a legendary 9th-century historical figure called "Sirijanga haang". It has been widely believed that it was this legendary historical figure who preserved and revived the ancient Limbu script, but many now feel that the Sirijonga haang legend was most likely created by the 18th-century Sirijanga himself, with the intention of making the Limbu and Lepcha people more ready to believe and follow his teachings.

Work

Sirijanga Sing Thebe researched and taught the Limbu script language and religion of the Limbu's in various part of Limbuwan and Sikkim, India. Sirijanga revived the old Limbu script. With the use of his newly revived script, he collected, composed and copied huge amounts of Limbu literature pertaining to history and cultural traditions. He travelled extensively through remote regions, attempting to amass sources of Limbu knowledge and culture. Eventually, he began going from village to village, publicising his findings and establishing centres of Limbu learning. In doing all of this, Sirijanga laid the foundation for a Limbu ethnic revival, and contributed significantly to the resistance against Tibetan Buddhist cultural domination. Sirijanga preached that acquiring broad cultural knowledge and experience was the key to the revival and enrichment of a community. In an attempt to trace the sources of his culture, he at first studied with local Tibetan Buddhist lamas, who at the time were the only means of connecting to a learned tradition in the region.

Sirijanga was also witness to the influx of the Hindu-based Khas culture from the western hill districts of today's Nepal. As such, along with his preliminary studies under the local lamas, he also practiced reading and writing in contemporary Khas, now known as Nepali. In order to better understand the dynamics at play in the region and to gather support for his movement, Sirijanga traveled far and wide to establish contact with rulers and powerful personalities. In one of these travels, it seems that he had either contacted or met King Jayaprakash Malla of Kathmandu. This multi-lingual and multi-cultural exposure to Buddhist and Hindu standards enabled Sirijanga to grasp the fundamentals of both the region's dominant cultures. During Sirijanga's life, the Bhutanese and Sikkimese quest for greater control over the eastern Himalaya led to many wars between Limbu and Sikkimese Bhutia (Bhutia indicating Tibetan origin) authorities. In due time, the lamas of Sikkim were able to extend their monastic centres in the northern areas of the part of Limbuwan that now lies in Nepal. After some time, this cultural encroachment enabled the Bhutia rulers to repeatedly subdue and take control of the entire Limbuwan territory.

The root of this state of conflict can be seen to lie in the politics of culture and knowledge at play in the region. Sikkimese Tibetan rulers and Buddhist spiritual leaders were able to subjugate the entire far-eastern Yakthung region by means of their hold over the established learned traditions and the systematic spiritual culture of Buddhism. It was the realisation of this that led Sirijanga to emphasise the necessity of a peaceful, knowledge-based movement.

Sirijanga's contribution to spreading Limbu script, Limbu language, Mundhum and literature are immense. The Postal Services Department, Nepal Philatelic Bureau, Kathmandu has issued a postal ticket in his name in the Personalities Series.

Death
In present-day terms, Sirijanga's ethnic movement can be said to be one of Limbu empowerment through education. Which had been denied to the local population by the Hindu Khas culture. Sirijanga himself was educated in a Tibetan Buddhist tradition. After meeting the Khas king, he was inspired to start an ethnic movement amongst the Yakthung and Khambus, so the continued sanskritisation of the Mongol ethnic group carried on. Sirijanga’s writings and teachings through the Limbu alphabet and literary texts he collected from different monasteries and villages attracted significant numbers of Limbu's and Lepchas, and led to the start of an ethnic awakening. Sirijanga was able to establish centres of Limbu cultural and religious learning in many places throughout the eastern Himalayan hills. In the style of Tibetan monastic centers, The Nepal kings felt  threatened having had conquered the lands of the Rais and limbus only recently (having had used the threats of the British in India) decided to use the Sikkim king as a ploy, misinforming the kings of Sikkim that Sirijanga’s was going to break the pact amongst the Sikkimese and the Lepchas people and further was going to murder the royal family in a coupe. In alliance with the mis information and propaganda provided by the Bahuns (ruling Hindu caste of Nepal having migrated from India and the Khas kings take their root and origin from), in their tactic of divide and rule (while bestowing flowery titles to the local Mongol groups further divided them into sub casts. Sirijanga was killed in Martam, Hee-Bermiok in West Sikkim in 1741 after being tied to a tree and shot at with arrows. The Limbu learning centres that he established were thus destroyed and Sirijanga's disciples murdered or brutally suppressed. Education for the masses in the  Buddhist tradition was thus suppressed amongst the Rais and limbus and like the educated Tamangs who was once viciously suppressed by the khas culture where education was meant only for their ruling elite casts. Thus for defying their insistence to convert and  his refusal to see his people as subjected by caste of the Khas culture and also for the growth of the Limbu language and script that Sirijunga, revaltilised, the place where Sirijunga was killed has a become a shrine to all people (irrespective of class, creed, and religion) from Sikkim and Nepal.

References

1704 births
1741 deaths
People from Taplejung District
Nepalese animists
Nepalese educators
Nepalese philosophers
Nepalese scholars
Language activists
Limbu people
18th-century Nepalese people